The 1956 election for the lower House of Representatives was held on 21 October in Jordan. The election witnessed the emergence of the National Socialist Party (NSP) as the party with the greatest number of seats—12 out of 40. Thus, King Hussein asked Suleiman Nabulsi (leader of the party) to form a government.

Nabulsi's cabinet, Jordan's only elected parliamentary government, lasted from October 1956 till April 1957. It was forced to resign on 10 April 1957 by senior royalist officials after its policies frequently clashed with that of the Palace. Ali Abu Nuwar, a nationalist army chief of staff who was said to have sympathized with Nabulsi's ousting, was alleged to have arranged a coup attempt on 13 April.

The Cabinet consisted of 11 ministers: seven ministers from the NSP, one from the Arab Socialist Ba'ath Party, one from the Communist Party, and two independents.

Cabinet

See also
 1957 alleged Jordanian military coup

References

1956 establishments in Jordan
1957 disestablishments in Jordan
Cabinet of Jordan
Prime Ministry of Jordan
Cabinets established in 1956
Cabinets disestablished in 1957